If I Were a Rich Man (Ah! Si j'étais riche) is a 2002 French film written and directed by Gérard Bitton and Michel Munz.

Plot

Aldo Bonnard (played by Jean-Pierre Darroussin) is about to divorce his wife Alice (Valeria Bruni Tedeschi) while his new boss, Gérard (Richard Berry), is a hypocritical man. Worse, he discovers that his wife has an affair with his boss. But one day, he wins a lottery of 10 million euros. He decides to leave his job and not to reveal the news to his wife until the day of the divorce.

Principal cast

 Jean-Pierre Darroussin : Aldo Bonnard
 Valeria Bruni-Tedeschi : Alice
 Richard Berry : Gérard
 François Morel : Jean-Phil
 Helena Noguerra : Priscille
 Tony Gaultier : Morillon
 Zinedine Soualem : Kader Benhassine
 Noémie Lvovsky : Claire
 Philippe Duquesne : Bergeron
 Sophie Mounicot : Madame Gabai
 Didier Flamand : Monsieur Agenor
 Aurélie Boquien : Madame Benhassine 
 Darry Cowl : Sylvain
 Frédéric Bouraly : Elvis
 Jean Dujardin : Le vendeur Weston
 Anne Marivin : The waitress

Remake 
The film inspired a Spanish remake, Si Yo Fuera Rico, which was released in November 2019.

References

External links

2002 films
Films set in Paris
French comedy films
2002 comedy films
2000s French films